Fifth Chukker Polo and Country Club  is a three thousand hectare equestrian site with three polo fields and lodging facilities, within Kangimi Resorts situated along Kaduna - Jos road in Igabi local government area of Kaduna State, Nigeria. The club was founded in 2001 and hosts private polo tournaments and two annual polo championships, a charity shield tournament and the Africans Patrons Club. Adjoining the club lawns is Kangimi Dam, the club promoters in cooperation with Kaduna State government initiated a public-private sector agreement to further develop Kangimi resorts with additions that will include a golf lawn and to expand lifestyle choices for visitors.

The field has played host to international professional polo players, the club supports some social responsible causes, partly a move to shed the elitist image of the game and also bring attention to the plight of children from different backgrounds.

References

Sport in Nigeria
Sports venues in Kaduna State
Sports clubs in Kaduna state
Tourist attractions in Kaduna State
Polo in Nigeria
Polo clubs
Sports clubs in Nigeria